Pedram Ardalany (born 6 August 1989) is an Iranian footballer who last played as a midfielder for Cumbernauld Colts.

Career

Ardalany signed a 2-year deal with Partick Thistle F.C. on 2 November 2007, in a contract that will keep him at Firhill Stadium until 31 May 2009.

Ardalany made his début for Partick Thistle on 8 April 2008, coming on as a second-half substitute in a 1-0 win over Stirling Albion.

Ardalany was released by Partick in January 2009. On 10 February 2009, he signed with junior club side Arthurlie F.C. until the end of the season, however he remained in Barrhead until 2011.

After leaving Arthurlie, Ardalany signed a short-term deal with Arbroath, before returning to Arthurlie in February 2012.

Ardalany returned to Scotland in 2018, after a spell with Iranian team Esteghlal Ahvaz.

References

External links

Iranian footballers
Association football midfielders
Partick Thistle F.C. players
Saipa F.C. players
Iranian expatriate footballers
People from Tehran
1989 births
Living people
Scottish Football League players
Arthurlie F.C. players
Expatriate footballers in Scotland
Scottish Junior Football Association players
Arbroath F.C. players
Esteghlal Ahvaz players
Cumbernauld Colts F.C. players